The Little Minister is a 1934 American drama film starring Katharine Hepburn and directed by Richard Wallace. The screenplay by Jane Murfin, Sarah Y. Mason, and Victor Heerman is based on the 1891 novel and subsequent 1897 play of the same title by J.M. Barrie. The picture was the fifth film adaptation of the works, following four silent film versions. The original novel was the third of the three "Thrums" novels (a town based on his home of Kirriemuir), which first brought Barrie to fame.

Plot
Set in rural 1840s Scotland, the film explores labor and class issues while telling the story of Gavin Dishart, a staid cleric who is newly assigned to Thrums' Auld Licht church, and Babbie, a member of the nobility who disguises herself as a gypsy girl in order to interact freely with the local villagers and protect them from her betrothed, Lord Rintoul, who wants to keep them under his control. The townsfolk christen Dishart “The Little Minister” on his arrival because of his youth (this is his first parish) and his short stature. Initially the conservative Dishart is appalled by the feisty girl, but he soon comes to appreciate her inner goodness. Their romantic liaison scandalizes the townspeople, and the minister's position is jeopardized until Dishart's heroism stuns and transforms the hearts of the local villagers.

Cast
 Katharine Hepburn as Babbie
 John Beal as Reverend Gavin Dishart
 Alan Hale as Rob Dow
 Donald Crisp as Doctor McQueen
 Lumsden Hare as Tammas Whammond
 Andy Clyde as Policeman Wearyworld
 Beryl Mercer as Mrs. Margaret Dishart, Gavin's mother
 Billy Watson as Micah Dow
 Dorothy Stickney as Jean Proctor
 Mary Gordon as Nanny Webster
 Frank Conroy as Lord Milford Rintoul
 Eily Malyon as Lady Evalina Rintoul
 Reginald Denny as Captain Halliwell

Production

Katharine Hepburn initially rejected the role of Babbie, then reconsidered, against the advice of her agent Leland Hayward, when Margaret Sullavan was offered the role. The film was budgeted at $650,000, which at the time was considered a high amount, and much of it was spent on exterior shooting in California's Sherwood Forest and Laurel Canyon and on the elaborate village set constructed on RKO Forty Acres back lot. (It later was used in a number of films, including Laurel and Hardy's Bonnie Scotland). It was RKO's most expensive film of the year and the most expensive film in which Hepburn had appeared.

The soundtrack includes the traditional Scottish tunes "The Bonnie Banks O' Loch Lomond," "Comin' Thro' the Rye," and "House of Argyle." The 3-CD set Max Steiner: The RKO Years 1929-1936 includes 10 tracks of incidental music that Steiner composed for the film.

The film held its world premiere at Radio City Music Hall in New York City.

Reception
In his review in The New York Times, Andre Sennwald described the film as "a tender and lovingly arranged screen edition of Sir James's rueful little Scottish romance...in its mild-mannered and sober way, The Little Minister proves to be a photoplay of genuine charm." The film was popular but its high cost resulted in a loss of $9,000 and contributed to Hepburn's reputation as "box-office poison."

Leonard Maltin gives The Little Minister three and a half out of four stars, calling the film “charming“ and Hepburn “radiant“.

References

External links
 
 
 
 

1934 films
1934 drama films
American drama films
American black-and-white films
Films scored by Max Steiner
American films based on plays
Films based on works by J. M. Barrie
Films directed by Richard Wallace
Films set in Scotland
Films set in the 1840s
RKO Pictures films
Films with screenplays by Jane Murfin
1930s English-language films
1930s American films